Schweizer Frauen-Verband was a women's organization in Switzerland, founded in 1885.   

It was the first national women's organization in Switzerland, and as such played a pioneering role in the Swiss women's movement. However, inner conflicts caused it to be dissolved in 1888, and a fraction of it founded the Schweizerischen Gemeinnützigen Frauenverein (SGF).

References 

1880s establishments in Switzerland
Feminism and history
Feminist organisations in Switzerland
Organizations established in 1885
Social history of Switzerland
Voter rights and suffrage organizations
Women's suffrage in Switzerland